The 1949 Chicago Hornets season was their fourth and final season in the All-America Football Conference. The team improved on their previous output of 1-13, winning four games. Despite the improvement, they failed to qualify for the playoffs and the team folded with the league.

Season schedule

Division standings

References

Chicago Rockets seasons
Chicago Hornets